This is a list of Portuguese football transfers for the summer of 2015. The summer transfer window will open 1 July and close at midnight on 1 September. Players may be bought before the transfer windows opens, but may only join their new club on 1 July. Only moves involving Primeira Liga clubs are listed. Additionally, players without a club may join a club at any time.

Transfers

 A player who signed with a club before the opening of the summer transfer window, will officially join his new club on 1 July. While a player who joined a club after 1 July will join his new club following his signature of the contract.

References

External links
 Primeira Liga Transfers

Lists of Portuguese football transfers
Football transfers summer 2015
2015–16 in Portuguese football